Red Devil Airport  is a public use airport located one nautical mile (1.85 km) northwest of the central business district of Red Devil, in Bethel Census Area of the U.S. state of Alaska.

Facilities 
It has one runway designated 10/28 with a gravel surface measuring 4,801 by 75 feet (1,463 x 23 m).

Airlines and destinations

Accidents and incidents
 On 24 March 1971, Douglas C-47B N49319 of Vanderpool Flying Service was damaged beyond economic repair in a landing accident. The aircraft was on an executive flight from Bethel Airport.

References

External links 
 FAA Alaska airport diagram (GIF)

Airports in the Bethel Census Area, Alaska